Heavy Metal Kings is the self-titled debut studio album by American underground hip hop duo Heavy Metal Kings. It was released on April 5, 2011 via Enemy Soil Records. Production was handled by C-Lance, Jack of All Trades, DJ Muggs, Gemcrates, Grand Finale, Junior Makhno, Shuko, Sicknature, Vherbal, and member Ill Bill. It features guest appearances from Crypt the Warchild, Q-Unique, Reef the Lost Cauze, Sabac Red and Slaine.

Track listing

Charts

References

External links

2011 albums
Heavy Metal Kings albums
Horrorcore albums
Enemy Soil Records albums
Albums produced by DJ Muggs